The Minister of Foreign Affairs of the Republic of Burkina Faso (previously known as the Republic of Upper Volta) is a government minister in charge of the Ministry of Foreign Affairs of Burkina Faso, responsible for conducting foreign relations of the country.

The following is a list of foreign ministers of Upper Volta/Burkina Faso since its founding in 1960:

Sources
Rulers.org – Foreign ministers A–D

Foreign
Foreign Ministers
Politicians